Samotlor Field is the largest oil field of Russia and the sixth largest in the world, owned and operated by Rosneft. The field is located at Lake Samotlor in Nizhnevartovsk district, Khanty–Mansi Autonomous Okrug, Tyumen Oblast.

History
The field was discovered in 1965. Development started in 1967 and first oil was produced in 1969.  Discovery of this field had changed Nizhnevartovsk from a small nearby village into a busy oil city as Samotlor used to be the most important oil production base of the Soviet Union. After breakup of the Soviet Union the field was owned by Samotlorneftgaz and TNK-Nizhnevartovsk, which later formed TNK-BP.

Over the all development period a total of 2,086 well clusters (containing more than 17,000 wells) have been built and about 2.6 billion tons of oil has been produced.  The peak production occurred in 1980 when Samotlor produced 158.9 million tons of oil.  The production has been in decline ever since, although according to TNK-BP  the field production has stabilized over the past last years after.

Reserves
The field is 80% depleted with water-cut up tp 90%. 

Up to 2012, TNK-BP plans to invest US$1 billion per year for maintaining oil production in it at the level of 30 million tons per year.

In media

The oil processing plant in Nizhnevartovsk is the scene of (but referred to by location rather than directly by name) the beginning of Tom Clancy's 1986 novel Red Storm Rising.

References

Sources
Kramer, Andrew E. "Mapmakers and Mythmakers: Russian Disinformation Practices Obscure Even Today's Oil Fields," New York Times (1 December 2005): C1.

Oil fields of Russia
Oil fields of the Soviet Union
Rosneft oil and gas fields